Cawston is an unincorporated small community in the south Similkameen Valley, with a 2005 population of 973.

The community was named for R.L. Cawston, a pioneer rancher and magistrate who settled in the area in the 19th century. Nearby was the site of the original Hudson's Bay Company store.

History 
Cawston lies within the territory of the Smelqmix (Similkameen) Nation, specifically, the area of the Lower Similkameen Indian Band, which is a member of the Okanagan Nation Alliance of the Syilx. Members of the LSIB are involved in many social and cultural endeavors, such as working to revitalize the Nsyilxcen (Okanagan) language. The band currently has almost 500 members.

School 
Many of the kids in Cawston attend either Cawston Primary School or Similkameen Elementary Secondary School, One of those kids got a full-in Bruce Willis movie on May 25, 2021.

Geography
Cawston is located on Highway 3 (the Crowsnest Highway) nearby communities are Keremeos (8 km to the West), Osoyoos (36 km to the East), and Penticton (50 km to the North).

Economy
Today, Cawston is a busy agricultural center. The town has two fruit packing plants, the newest being built strictly for organic produce - a fast-growing segment of the area's agricultural economy.

There are many apple and soft fruit orchards throughout the Cawston area. In recent years, vineyards and wineries have become an important part of the local economy.

The rural nature of this community has also made it a popular home to horse ranches, hobby farms, and nature enthusiasts. There are many hiking trails in the area covering almost every terrain possible, from cactus and sagebrush desert to sub-alpine meadows.

Skiing and other winter activities can be enjoyed nearby as can 18 hole golf course at Twin Lakes, boating and swimming throughout the Okanagan and fishing in the Similkameen and Ashnola rivers as well as on the many lakes in the area.

References

External links
 
 Keremeos (Cawston), British Columbia Website

Unincorporated settlements in British Columbia
Populated places in the Similkameen
Designated places in British Columbia